Boris Odwong (Greek: Μπόρις Οντβόνγκ born 20 January 1991) is an Italian footballer who is last known to have played for Doxa Vyronas.

Career

Malta

Staying with Floriana until the end of 2011, Odwong debuted in a 2-02 win over Mqabba. Drawing interest from Naxxar Lions, he score d three goals versus Birżebbuġa St. Peter's 4-2.

Moldova

Signing with Rapid Ghidighici approaching March 2012, the Sampdoria youth trainee was suspended by Rapid midway through November that year for giving tepid performances and unsportsmanlike behavior according to the management. When Greece's Kalamata requested that they give them the documents for the Nigerian-Italian, the Moldovan Football Federation responded that he was unavailable. In total, he made 7 appearances and did not score a goal in the Moldovan National Division.

Personal life
Born in Italy, Odwong was raised in Rome, Italy.

References

External links 
 
 Ve lo ricordate Boris Odwong? 
 Cyprus Football Association Profile 2015/16 First Half
 Cyprus Football Association Profile 2015/16 Second Half

1991 births
Living people
Footballers from Rome
Nigerian footballers
Italian footballers
Italian people of Nigerian descent
Italian sportspeople of African descent
Association football forwards
Expatriate footballers in Cyprus
Expatriate footballers in Moldova
Maltese Premier League players
Floriana F.C. players
U.S. Viterbese 1908 players
APEP FC players
PAEEK players
U.C. Sampdoria players
Nigerian expatriate footballers
Expatriate footballers in Greece
Expatriate footballers in Malta
Naxxar Lions F.C. players
Kalamata F.C. players
A.E. Karaiskakis F.C. players
Tsiklitiras Pylos F.C. players
Cypriot Second Division players
Doxa Vyronas F.C. players